Microsoft HoloLens 2 is an augmented reality (AR) headset developed and manufactured by Microsoft. It is the successor to the original Microsoft HoloLens. The first variant of the device, The HoloLens 2 enterprise edition, debuted on February 24, 2019. This was followed by a developer edition that was announced on May 2, 2019. The HoloLens 2 was subsequently released in limited numbers on November 7, 2019.

Description 
The HoloLens 2 was announced by lead HoloLens developer Alex Kipman on February 24, 2019 at Mobile World Congress (MWC) in Barcelona, Spain. On May 7, 2019 the HoloLens 2 was shown again at the Microsoft Build developer conference. There, it showcased an application created with the Unreal Game Engine.

The HoloLens 2 are combination waveguide and laser-based stereoscopic & full-color mixed reality smartglasses developed and manufactured by Microsoft. The US military's Integrated Visual Augmentation System is a further development of Hololens 2.

The HoloLens 2 is an early AR device. The displays on the HoloLens 2 are simple waveguide displays with a fixed focus of approximately two meters. Because of the fixed focus, the displays exhibit the Vergence-Accommodation Conflict, which is an unpleasant visual sensation for the viewer.

On August 20, 2019, at the Hot Chips 31 symposium Microsoft presented their Holographic Processing Unit (HPU) 2.0 custom design for the HoloLens 2 with the following features:

 7x SIMD Fixed Point (SFP) for 2D processing
 6x Floating Vector Processor (FVP) for 3D processing
 >1 TOP of programmable compute
 125Mb SRAM
 79mm2 die size and 2 billion transistors
 TSMC 16FF+ process
 PCIe 2.0 x1 at 100 MB/s bandwidth to Snapdragon 850

On August 29, 2019, at the World Artificial Intelligence Conference in Shanghai, Microsoft's Executive Vice President, Harry Shum, revealed that HoloLens 2 would go on sale in September 2019. The product started shipping on November 7, 2019.

Improvements over the previous model 
Microsoft highlighted three main improvements made to the device: immersiveness, ergonomics and business friendliness.

HoloLens 2 has a diagonal field of view of 52 degrees, improving over the 34 degree field of view (FOV) of the first edition of HoloLens, although Karl Guttag states that it offers less than 20 pixels per degree of resolution (despite Microsoft's claim that it would keep a resolution of 47 pixels per degree).

Holographic Processing Unit (HPU) 2.0 improvements compared to the HPU 1.0:

 1.7x compute
 2x effective DRAM bandwidth
 Improved hologram stability
 New hardware accelerated workloads such as eye tracking, fully articulated hand tracking, semantic labeling, spatial audio and JBL filter

HoloLens 2 emulation 
The HoloLens 2 Emulator was made available to developers on April 17, 2019. This emulator allows developers to create applications for the HoloLens 2 before the device ships.

References

External links

Microsoft Documentation for HoloLens Emulator

Augmented reality
Computing input devices
Gesture recognition
Head-mounted displays
History of human–computer interaction
Microphones
Microsoft peripherals
Mixed reality
Wearable devices
Windows 10